Vera Zvonareva was the defending champion, but chose to compete in Dubai this week.

Sofia Arvidsson won the title by defeating Marta Domachowska 6–2, 2–6, 6–3 in the final.

Seeds

Draw

Finals

Top half

Bottom half

References
 Main and Qualifying Rounds

2006 WTA Tour
2006 Singles